Mount Shute  is a mountain  standing 14 miles (22 km) southeast of Austin Peak in Mirabito Range, Antarctica. Mapped by United States Geological Survey (USGS) from surveys and U.S. Navy air photos 1960 63. Named by Advisory Committee on Antarctic Names (US-ACAN) for Larry R. Shute, United States Antarctic Research Program (USARP) meteorologist at Hallett Station, 1963–64.

References 

Mountains of Victoria Land
Pennell Coast